Gérard Gagnon, Vietnamese name Nhân (fl. 1970s), is a Canadian Redemptorist priest formerly based in Da Lat, Vietnam. He worked on new Bible translations into Vietnamese, the Tâm Ngọc, following the work of the Alsatian priest Albert Schlicklin (Vietnamese name Cố Chính Linh).

References

Translators of the Bible into Vietnamese
20th-century Canadian Roman Catholic priests
Living people
Redemptorists
Year of birth missing (living people)